"" is the national anthem of both the Republic of Turkey and the Turkish Republic of Northern Cyprus. It was officially adopted by Grand National Assembly on 12 March 1921—two-and-a-half years before the 29 October 1923 establishment of the nation—both as a motivational musical saga for the troops fighting in the Turkish War of Independence, and as an aspirational anthem for a Republic that was yet to be established.

Penned by Mehmet Âkif Ersoy, and ultimately composed by Osman Zeki Üngör, the theme is one of affection for the Turkish homeland, freedom, and faith, as well as praise for the virtues of hope, devotion, and sacrifice in the pursuit of liberty, all explored through visual, tactile, and kinesthetic imagery as these concepts relate to the flag, the human spirit, and the soil of the homeland. The original manuscript by Ersoy carries the dedication  – "To our Heroic Army", in reference to the people's army that ultimately won the Turkish War of Independence, with lyrics that reflect on the sacrifices of the soldiers during the war.

It is regularly heard during state and military events, as well as during national festivals, bayrams, sporting events, and school ceremonies. Visual depictions can also be found adorning state or public displays, such as in the form of a scroll displaying the first two quatrains of the anthem on the reverse of the Turkish 100 lira banknotes of 1983–1989.

Of the ten-stanza anthem, only the first two quatrains are sung.

A framed version of the national anthem typically occupies the wall above the blackboard in the classrooms of Turkish schools, accompanied by a Turkish flag, a photograph of the country's founding savior Atatürk, and a copy of Atatürk's famous speech to the nation's youth from the concluding remarks to his 20 October 1927 address to the Parliament.

In 1983, the Turkish Republic of Northern Cyprus also adopted the Turkish national anthem under Article II of the Constitution of Northern Cyprus.

History

The present-day anthem is a collective effort by several prominent poets, musicians, and composers that took form over several years due to the relatively tumultuous nature of the period in which it was crafted.

Even before the full official dissolution of the Ottoman Empire, a nationwide competition was organized in 1921 by the Turkish National Movement — an independent and self-organized militia force led by Mustafa Kemal Atatürk waging a lengthy campaign for independence against both invading foreign powers and the Ottoman Court itself, due to the latter being  treasonous and complicit in the partitioning of the Turkish homeland in the aftermath of the 1920 Treaty of Sèvres. The goal of the competition was to select an original composition suitable for a National March, intended to both motivate the militia forces fighting for independence across the country, and to provide inspiration and pride for a new homeland that would be established once victory was achieved.

A total of 724 poems were submitted. Mehmet Akif Ersoy, a well-known poet of the period, initially refused to participate due to a monetary prize being offered in the competition, but was subsequently contacted and convinced by the National Parliament to submit a poem and disregard the reward. The resulting ten-stanza-long poem written by Ersoy was recited to the National Assembly by representative Hamdullah Suphi, on 1 March 1921, where it was unanimously adopted by the deputies following evaluation by a parliamentary committee. The prize of the competition was later bestowed on a society of veterans.

Shortly thereafter, twenty-four composers participated in another competition arranged for the selection of a musical composition that would best suit the elected anthem. The committee, which was only able to convene in 1924 due to the 1919–1923 Turkish War of Independence, adopted the music composed by Ali Rıfat Çağatay.

This early composition by Çağatay lasted only six years. In 1930, a new composition by Osman Zeki Üngör, virtuoso composer and the first conductor of the Presidential Symphony Orchestra of the Republic of Turkiye, was adopted as a permanent musical arrangement by Parliament. Shortly thereafter, in 1932, eminent Turkish composer, conductor, and musicologist (of Armenian descent) Edgar Manas was commissioned by the Turkish government to harmonize and orchestrate the melody created by Üngör, and the final and official version of the anthem took form.

Lyrics

The full lyrics of the Turkish national anthem consist of 41 lines of verses, though only the first 8 lines (shown in bold) are performed in official ceremonies.

Footnotes:

Notes

References

External links 

 Vocal of the İstiklal Marşı in Ogg Vorbis
 Official Records of the Grand National Assembly of The Republic of Turkey on the parliamentary debates and history of the İstiklal Marşı - Zabit Ceridesi - 12.03.1921 
   (archive link)

National symbols of Turkey
Turkish Cypriot culture
Asian anthems
Turkish words and phrases
European anthems
National anthems
Turkish music
National anthem compositions in G minor
National anthem compositions in A-flat minor
Turkish military marches